Lucignolo capensis is a species of leaf beetle endemic to South Africa, and the only member of the genus Lucignolo. It was first described by Édouard Lefèvre in 1890 as a species of the genus Trichostola. It was later found to be closely related to Odontionopa, and was placed in its own genus by Stefano Zoia in 2010.

The genus is named after Lucignolo (or "Candlewick"), a character from Carlo Collodi's The Adventures of Pinocchio. This name refers to the shiny, delicate body of L. capensis.

References

Eumolpinae
Endemic beetles of South Africa
Taxa named by Édouard Lefèvre
Beetles described in 1890